Reminiscing is a studio album by Slim Whitman, released in 1965 on Imperial Records.

Track listing 
The album was issued in the United States and Canada by Imperial Records as a 12-inch long-playing record, catalog numbers LP-9288 (mono) and LP-12288 (stereo).

References 

1965 albums
Slim Whitman albums
Imperial Records albums